Timotheos Christofi (Greek: Τιμόθεος Χριστοφή; born 11 December 1987) is a Cypriot football referee who is a listed international referee since 2018. He officiates for Europa League Games  and for Cyprus First Division. On 31 October 2018 he officiated the biggest derby in Cypriot football, APOEL vs Omonia Nicosia, for the first time.

References 

Living people
Cypriot football referees
1987 births